Manuel Mamikonian was the real leader of Armenia after the exile of King Varasdates (Varazdat) who ruled from 374 until 378. The Mamikonian family had long been the leading generals of Armenia, holding the title of sparapet, commander-in-chief.

Manuel had served in the Kushan War in the troops of the Persian king. His brother Mushegh I Mamikonian had been slain by Varasdates and Manuel had come to be sparapet in his place. In 378 Varasdates and Manuel had become so mad at each other that they went to war.

According to Faustus of Byzantium, Manuel was convinced that the Persian ruler was plotting against him and so attacked the Persian emissary Suren and his 10,000 troops. Manuel decimated Suren's army but allowed Suren to live and leave. This led to an invasion of Armenia by the Persian forces. Armies under generals such as Varaz were sent to invade Armenia but were defeated by Manuel. According to Faustus, this led to seven years of peace for Armenia. Manuel died in 385 to 386. His daughter Vardanduxt was the wife of the Armenian King, Arsaces III (Arshak III).

References

Sources
Faustus of Byzantium, History of the Armenians, 5th century
History of Urartu and Armenia, in Encyclopædia Britannica, 15th Edition, Vo. 18, p. 1042

385 deaths
Sparapets
Armenian nobility
Year of birth unknown
Manuel
4th-century Armenian people
Generals of Shapur II
Armenian people from the Sasanian Empire